Nahom Mesfin Tariku (Amharic:  ናሆም መስፍን ታሪኩ ; born 6 March 1989) is an Ethiopian runner who specialized in the 3000 metres steeplechase. He competed at the Summer Olympics in 2008 and 2012. He was born in Dila.

Running career
He reached the steeplechase final at the 2007 World Championships in Athletics.  Nahom represented Ethiopia at the 2008 Summer Olympics, running the steeplechase.  He represented Ethiopia again in the same event at the 2012 Summer Olympics.

In 2013 he moved to the United States, where he transitioned into a road racer. He first trained in Flagstaff, Arizona in order to run at high altitude. He subsequently moved to Alexandria, Virginia, and went on to win a series of races in the Washington, D.C. metropolitan area. At a very competitive 2014 Cherry Blossom 10 Mile Run, Mesfin finished in 12th place with a time of 47:30.

Competition record

Personal bests
3000 metres indoor- 7:46.39 min (2008)
3000 metres steeplechase - 8:12.04 min (2011)
1500 metres indoor- 3:43.31 (2008)
5000 metres- 13:29.74 (2009)
2000 metres steeplechase- 5:29.51 (2005)

References

External links
 

1989 births
Living people
Ethiopian male long-distance runners
Ethiopian male steeplechase runners
Olympic athletes of Ethiopia
Athletes (track and field) at the 2008 Summer Olympics
Athletes (track and field) at the 2012 Summer Olympics
Sportspeople from Southern Nations, Nationalities, and Peoples' Region
African Games bronze medalists for Ethiopia
African Games medalists in athletics (track and field)
World Athletics Championships athletes for Ethiopia
Athletes (track and field) at the 2007 All-Africa Games
20th-century Ethiopian people
21st-century Ethiopian people